Events in the year 2013 in Lithuania.

Incumbents 
President: Dalia Grybauskaitė
Prime Minister: Algirdas Butkevičius

Events 

 Amber Grid established

Art and entertainment 
Lithuania in the Eurovision Song Contest 2013 hosted in Malmö, Sweden.
Debut of Secret Story (Lithuanian TV series)

Sports 
 2012–13 Lithuanian Football Cup
 2013 European Track Championships
2013 Baltic Chain Tour
2013–14 Lithuanian Handball League
2013–14 Lithuanian Hockey League season
2013–14 Lithuanian Women's Handball League

 Lithuania at the 2013 Summer Universiade
 Lithuania at the 2013 World Aquatics Championships
 Lithuania at the 2013 World Championships in Athletics

References 

 
Lithuania